Josh Brolin is an American actor who has received various awards and nominations throughout his career.

In 2007, Brolin won a Screen Actors Guild Award for Outstanding Performance by a Cast in a Motion Picture for the neo-Western thriller film No Country for Old Men.
In 2008, he portrayed the American politician Dan White in the movie Milk, which earned him an Academy Award nomination for Best Supporting Actor, as well as wins for a Critics' Choice Movie Award for Best Acting Ensemble, and for a National Board of Review Award and a New York Film Critics Circle Award for Best Supporting Actor. His performance as the U.S. president George W. Bush in the film W. (2008) earned him nominations for the London Film Critics' Circle Awards and the Satellite Awards. In 2014, he collaborated with Paul Thomas Anderson in the film Inherent Vice, for which he received an Independent Spirit Robert Altman Award shared with the cast and crew, and a nomination for the Critics' Choice Movie Award for Best Supporting Actor.

From 2014 to 2019, Brolin portrayed Thanos in the Marvel Cinematic Universe, for which he won a Saturn Award, an MTV Movie & TV Award, and two Washington D.C. Area Film Critics Association Awards among others.

Awards and nominations

Notes

References

External links 
  

Brolin, Josh